Heikki Olavi ("Olli") Partanen (18 August 1922, in Kouvola – 15 June 2014) was a Finnish discus thrower. Partanen won EM-bronze in the discus throw in Bryssel 1950 with the result 48,69. He was born in Kouvola. Partanen performed his record 50,14 25 September 1949 in Karhula. He represented Kouvolan Urheilijat (Finnish. The Sportsmen of Kouvola) in the club level. During the Second World War he served Nazi Germany in the Finnish Volunteer Battalion of the Waffen-SS.

References 
Olli Partanen's profile at Sports Reference.com

1922 births
2014 deaths
People from Kouvola
Finnish male discus throwers
Athletes (track and field) at the 1952 Summer Olympics
Olympic athletes of Finland
European Athletics Championships medalists
Finnish Waffen-SS personnel
Sportspeople from Kymenlaakso